Sonnet 152 is a sonnet by William Shakespeare. It is one of a collection of 154 sonnets, dealing with themes such as the passage of time, love, beauty and mortality, first published in a 1609.

Synopsis
Although concluding the sequence of The Dark Lady sonnets (Sonnets 127-152), sonnet 152 provides no happy ending to the series. This sonnet tells of how the narrator judges his mistress, but then he realizes that he cannot judge her, as he as well has been sinful.

Structure 
Sonnet 152 is an English or Shakespearean sonnet. The English sonnet has three quatrains, followed by a final rhyming couplet. It follows the typical rhyme scheme of the form ABAB CDCD EFEF GG and is composed in iambic pentameter, a type of poetic metre based on five pairs of metrically weak/strong syllabic positions. The 12th line exemplifies a regular iambic pentameter:

×   /     ×    /   × /       ×   /     ×   / 
Or made them swear against the thing they see; (152.12)

The 2nd line has a final extrametrical syllable or feminine ending:

 ×    /  ×     /    ×   /     ×  /  ×     / (×)
But thou art twice forsworn, to me love swearing; (152.2)
/ = ictus, a metrically strong syllabic position. × = nonictus. (×) = extrametrical syllable.

Lines 4, 5, 7, 9, and 11 also have feminine endings. Line 10 begins with a common metrical variant, an initial reversal:

/     ×    ×  /      ×   /      ×  /   ×  / 
Oaths of thy love, thy truth, thy constancy; (152.10)

An initial reversal potentially occurs in line 11, and mid-line reversals potentially occur in lines 7 and 9.

Notes

References

British poems
Sonnets by William Shakespeare